The Alabama A&M Bulldogs are the college football team representing the Alabama Agricultural and Mechanical University. They play in the NCAA Division I Football Championship Subdivision (FCS) as a member of the Southwestern Athletic Conference.

Rivalries

Alabama State

The Alabama State Hornets are A&M's arch-rival as the teams play annually in the Magic City Classic on the last Saturday in October at Birmingham's Historic Legion Field. A&M and State first played each other in 1924, though the annual classic began November 9, 1940 in Birmingham. The game has grown at Legion Field, a neutral site roughly halfway between the two campuses. The schools competed from 1947 to 1975 in the Southern Intercollegiate Athletic Conference. The rivalry has intensified since A&M joined State as a member of the Southwestern Athletic Conference in 1999, with the two teams regularly in contention for the Eastern Division Crown. A&M leads the overall series 44–40–3 and holds a 44–34–3 edge over State in Birmingham. A&M holds a 16–& advantage as SWAC opponents, with one State wins vacated due to NCAA violations. State won the first eight contests, holding the longest streak in the series. A&M longest win streak is seven from 1960 to 1966 coinciding with the arrival of Coach Louis Crews.

Tuskegee
A&M's other in-state rivalry is with the Tuskegee Golden Tigers. The Bulldogs and Tigers began their series in 1932 and would not meet on the gridiron for another 20 years. They played annually from 1963 to 1999 including 35 years as conference rivals in the Southern Intercollegiate Athletic Conference. The series was discontinued in 2000 as A&M moved up to Division I after joining the SWAC in 1998. A&M and Tuskegee played a two-game set from 2008 to 2009, and renewed their rivalry again from 2011 to 2014. The two teams last met in Mobile for the 2021 Gulf Coast Challenge, with A&M leading the series 29–20–3.

Championships

National championships
In 2020–21, A&M was voted consensus black college football national championship as the only undefeated HBCU football team in the country. The Bulldogs were voted #1 in both BOXTOROW HBCU Coaches and Media Polls as well as the historic SBN (Sheridan Broadcasting Network) Sports Poll. This is the A&M's first national championship and the third for Coach Maynor, who was voted #1 by SBN in 2011 at Winston-Salem State.

Conference championships
A&M has won or shared a total of 14 league titles in football including two undefeated seasons. The Bulldogs have won two Southwestern Athletic Conference (SWAC) championships, after claiming 12 conference crowns as a member of the Southern Intercollegiate Athletic Conference (SIAC) from 1947 to 1997.

† Co-champions

Postseason

Bowl games
Alabama A&M participated in two NCAA College Division bowl games as members of the SIAC.

Playoffs

A&M has participated in the NCAA Division II Football Championship playoffs twice, with a 1–2 record in three games. Each loss came against the eventual national runner-up.

SWAC Championship Game

The Bulldogs have represented the SWAC East in seven conference championship games, the most of any team in the division. Both wins have come against

Notable players

Players of the Year

Hall of Fame Inductees

Retired numbers

Alumni in the NFL
Over 16 Alabama A&M alumni have played in the NFL, including:

John Stallworth
Robert Mathis
Howard Ballard
Frank Kearse
Ronnie Coleman
Joe Patton
Barry Wagner
Mike Hegman
Oliver Ross
Mike Williams
Johnny Baldwin
Jamaal Johnson-Webb
Anthony Lanier
 Kendrick Rogers

Notable coaches

References

External links

 

 
American football teams established in 1912
1912 establishments in Alabama